Främling (English: "Stranger") is the debut studio album by Swedish pop singer Carola Häggkvist, released on 26 March 1983. On the album charts, the album debuted and peaked at number one in Sweden and number two in Norway.

Track listing
"Främling" (Lasse Holm - Monica Forsberg)
"Säg mig var du står" ("Why, tell me why") (M. Duiser, G. Elias, P. Souer - Ingela Forsman)
"Benjamin" (M. Duiser, G. Elias - Ingela Forsman)
"Gör det någonting" (Torgny Söderberg - Monica Forsberg)
"Gloria" (Giancarlo Bigazzi, Umberto Tozzi - Ingela Forsman)
"You Bring Out the Best in Me" (B. Findon - M. Myers)
"Mickey" (Nicky Chinn, Mike Chapman - Ingela Forsman)
"Se på mig" (Lasse Holm - Ingela Forsman)
"Liv" (Lasse Holm - Ingela Forsman)
"Visa lite mänsklighet" ("A Little Tenderness") (M. Leeson, P. Vale - Liza Öhman)
"14 maj" ("4th of July") (T. Cliff, B. Wade - Ingela Forsman)
"Du försvinner i natten" ("Paris Dies in the Morning") (A. McCrorie-Shand, L. Sayer - Liza Öhman)

Charts

References

1983 debut albums
Carola Häggkvist albums